Fernandus is a given name. Notable people with the name include:

Fernandus Payne (1881–1977), American zoologist, geneticist, and educator
Fernandus Vinson (born 1968), American football player

See also
Fernandes
2496 Fernandus, a main-belt asteroid